Damphu may refer to:

Damphu, Tsirang, a town in Bhutan, capital of Tsirang district
Damphu drum, a type of Nepalese drum